Cücük (also, Cucuk, Chodzhuk, and Dzhyudzhyuk) is a village and municipality in the Agdash Rayon of Azerbaijan.  It has a population of 503.

References 

Populated places in Agdash District